Lewis Du Moulin (Ludovicus Molinaeus; pseudonym: Ludiomaeus Colvinus; 1606–1680) was a French Huguenot physician and controversialist, who settled in England. He became Camden Professor of History at the University of Oxford.

Life
He was born in Paris, the son of theologian Pierre Du Moulin, and brother of Wolfgang Du Mulin, Peter Du Moulin. He qualified M.D. at the University of Leiden, and came to England to practice medicine as a young man.

He was a moderate critic of episcopacy, identified as an Erastian. He was on good terms with John Owen and Richard Baxter, but also Joseph Hall.

He obtained the Camden Professorship in 1646 after petitioning Parliament. He was ejected from the position in 1660.

Works
Vox populi (1641) as Irenaus Philadelphus
Aytomaxia, or, the self-contradiction of some that contend about church-government (1643) as Ireneus Philalethes
The power of the Christian magistrate in sacred things (1650)
Morum exemplar seu caracteres (1654)
Paraenesis ad aedificatores imperii in imperio (1656)
Of the Right of Churches (1658)
Kern der Alchemie (1750) Digital edition by the University and State Library Düsseldorf

References
Concise Dictionary of National Biography

Notes

1606 births
1680 deaths
17th-century English medical doctors
17th-century French physicians
French Protestants
Erastians
Camden Professors of Ancient History